The French destroyer Albatros was one of six  (contre-torpilleurs) built for the French Navy in the interwar period.

During World War II, on 14 June 1940 she participated in Operation Vado, a raid of French cruisers and destroyers from Toulon to bombard Italian targets at Genoa and Savona; the coastal battery "Mameli" struck her with one  round, which penetrated her fire-room and killed twelve sailors. After France surrendered to Germany, Albatros served with the naval forces of Vichy France. She was at Casablanca in French Morocco when Allied forces invaded French North Africa in Operation Torch in November 1942. Badly damaged, she was beached to prevent her from sinking. After World War II, she was repaired and returned to service.

Notes

References

 
 

Aigle-class destroyers
1930 ships
Ships built in France
Maritime incidents in November 1942